Cian O'Sullivan (born 1998) is an Irish hurler who plays for Dublin Championship club St. Brigid's and at inter-county level with the Dublin senior hurling team. He usually lines out as a left corner-forward.

Career

A member of the St. Brigid's club in Castleknock, O'Sullivan first came to prominence on the inter-county scene with the Dublin minor team that won the 2016 Leinster Minor Championship. He subsequently spent two seasons with the Dublin under-21 team, while simultaneously lining out with Trinity College in the Fitzgibbon Cup. O'Sullivan made his senior debut during the 2017 National League.

Career statistics

Honours

Dublin
Leinster Minor Hurling Championship: 2016

References

External links
Cian O'Sullivan profile at the Dublin GAA website

1998 births
Living people
St Brigid's (Dublin) hurlers
Dublin inter-county hurlers